The number of Romani people in Ireland is roughly estimated, as the Central Statistics Office collects its data based on nationality and not ethnic origin. For this reason a precise demographic profile of the Romani in Ireland is not available.  Some estimates of Romani in Ireland give the population at 1,700 in 2004 rising to between 2,500 and 3,000 in 2005. with the majority originating from Romani populations from Ukraine and Hungary.

History

Origin
The Romani people originate from Northern India, presumably from the northwestern Indian states Rajasthan and Punjab.

The linguistic evidence has indisputably shown that roots of Romani language lie in India: the language has grammatical characteristics of Indian languages and shares with them a big part of the basic lexicon, for example, body parts or daily routines.

More exactly, Romani shares the basic lexicon with Hindi and Punjabi. It shares many phonetic features with Marwari, while its grammar is closest to Bengali.

Genetic findings in 2012 suggest the Romani originated in northwestern India and migrated as a group.
According to a genetic study in 2012, the ancestors of present scheduled tribes and scheduled caste populations of Northern India, traditionally referred to collectively as the Ḍoma, are the likely ancestral populations of the modern European Roma.

In February 2016, during the International Roma Conference, the Indian Minister of External Affairs stated that the people of the Roma community were children of India. The conference ended with a recommendation to the Government of India to recognize the Roma community spread across 30 countries as a part of the Indian diaspora.

Migration to Ireland
Romani have been present in Ireland since the 18th century. Traditionally, Romani arrived from Britain for seasonal work, either as farm labourers or as coppersmiths

Post-1989 
After the dissolution of Eastern Bloc, thousands of Romani, among others, sought asylum in Ireland and other Western countries. Their arrival prompted contrasting editorials in the mainstream newspapers.  In 1989, Romani started to arrive in Ireland, predominantly by hiding in container lorries. In the summer of 1998, several hundred Romani arrived hidden in freight containers in Rosslare Harbour, many of them illegally trafficked.

A second impetus for Romani immigration arose after the admittance of an additional 15 states to the European Union, with the populations coming to Dublin and the other major towns and cities.

References

External links

 Access Ireland - Training Roma as cultural mediators
 Roma Educational Needs in Ireland - Context and Challenges  Lesovitch, L., June 2005 City of Dublin VEC

Ireland
 
Ireland
Society of Ireland